Anton Gaaei (born 19 November 2002) is a Danish footballer who plays as a right-back for Danish Superliga club Viborg FF.

Club career

Viborg FF
Anton Gaaei started his career in Bruunshåb/Tapdrup IF and then passed by Overlund GF, before he moved to Viborg FF. From the summer 2020, Gaaei began training regular with the first team. On 2 September 2020, Gaaei got his official debut for Viborg, as he came on from the bench in the 76th minute against FC Fredericia in the Danish Cup. Three months later, in December 2020, Gaaei signed a new deal with Viborg until June 2023.

In his youth, Gaaei was primarily a winger, but was later converted to right-back. On 1 April 2022, Gaaei got his league debut for Viborg and Danish Superliga debut in a game a against SønderjyskE. Gaaei ended the 2021-22 season with six appearances.

References

External links
 

2002 births
Living people
Danish men's footballers
Association football wingers
Association football fullbacks
Viborg FF players
Danish Superliga players